Ciprian Panait (born 22 November 1976) is a Romanian football manager who is currently in charge of Qatari Club Al-Kharaitiyat SC.

References

External links
Official website
 

1976 births
Living people
People from Ploiești
Romanian football managers
Romanian expatriate football managers
Al Hilal SFC managers
Al-Raed FC managers
Al Batin FC managers
Saudi Professional League managers
Romanian expatriate sportspeople in Saudi Arabia
Expatriate football managers in Saudi Arabia